The 2002 World Figure Skating Championships were held at the M-Wave Arena in Nagano, Japan from March 16 to 24, sanctioned by the International Skating Union. Medals were awarded in the disciplines of men's singles, ladies' singles, pair skating, and ice dancing.

Medal table

Competition notes
It was the first ISU competition after the much publicized 2002 Olympic judging controversy. Neither pairs gold medalists chose to attend. Both went pro soon after.

2002 Worlds was the first time Israel had ever won a medal at Worlds.

Due to the large number of participants, the men's and ladies' qualifying groups were split into groups A and B.

The first compulsory dance was the Golden Waltz. The second was the Quickstep.

Results

Men

Ladies

Pairs

Ice dancing

References

External links
 2002 World Figure Skating Championships
 https://web.archive.org/web/20120324011920/http://ww2.isu.org/news/fsworlds1.html
 https://web.archive.org/web/20120324011925/http://ww2.isu.org/news/fsworlds2.html
 https://web.archive.org/web/20120324011934/http://ww2.isu.org/news/fsworlds3.html
 https://web.archive.org/web/20120324011944/http://ww2.isu.org/news/fsworlds4.html
 https://web.archive.org/web/20120324011948/http://ww2.isu.org/news/fsworlds5.html

World Figure Skating Championships
World Figure Skating Championships
World Figure Skating Championships
World Figure Skating Championships
Sports competitions in Nagano (city)
International figure skating competitions hosted by Japan
March 2002 sports events in Asia